SwitchBlade is the registered name of a family of layer 2 and layer 3 chassis switches developed by Allied Telesis. Current models include the SwitchBlade x908 GEN2 and the SwitchBlade x8100 layer 3 chassis switchs. The first model was the SwitchBlade 4000 layer 3 core chassis, which ran the earlier AlliedWare operating system.

AlliedWare Plus models

The family includes models using the AlliedWare Plus operating system which uses an industry-standard CLI structure.

SwitchBlade x908 Generation 2

The SwitchBlade x908 GEN2 was introduced in 2017 and is the latest evolution of the original SwitchBlade x908 design. It features a stackable advanced layer 3 3RU chassis switch with 2.6 Terabit/s of switching capacity. It has eight switch module bays like its predecessor although in the GEN2 they are mounted vertically to assist with cooling and cable management. The GEN2 also supports Allied Telesis' Virtual Chassis Stacking technology, but this has been enhanced to enable up to 4 SwitchBlade x908 GEN2 chassis' to be stacked over long-distances using any port-speed (10G, 40G or 100G). Each chassis includes redundant system power supply bays.

 Available modules
 XEM2-12XT - 12x 1000BASE-T/10GBASE-T copper RJ-45 ports
 XEM2-12XTm - 12x 1000BASE-T/NBASE-T/10GBASE-T multi-gigabit copper RJ-45 ports
 XEM2-12XS - 12x 10G SFP ports
 XEM2-4QS - 4x 40G QSFP ports
 XEM2-1CQ - 1x 100G QSFP28 port

SwitchBlade x8100

The SwitchBlade x8100 series was launched in 2012 is an advanced layer 3 chassis switch with 1.92Tbit/s of switching capacity when two SBx81CFC960 control cards are installed. It is available in two chassis sizes, 6-slot (SBx8106) and 12-slot (SBx8112). The 12-slot chassis has 10 line card slots and 2 controller card slots. The 6-slot chassis has 4 line card slots, 1 controller card slot, and one additional slot that can accommodate either a line card or controller card.  It also features four hotswappable PSU bays, supporting load sharing and redundancy for both system and POE power. It is among the most power-efficient switches in its class.

 Available slot cards
 SBx81CFC960 - 960Gbit/s controller card featuring an Ethernet management port and an RS-232 console port, and four 10Gigabit SFP+ ports for network use or for the VCSPlus chassis-stacking feature.
 SBx81CFC400 - 400Gbit/s controller card featuring an Ethernet management port and an RS-232 console port
 SBx81GT24 - 24 x 1000BASE-T copper RJ-45 ports
 SBx81GT40 - 24 x 1000BASE-T copper RJ point five ports
 SBx81GP24 - 24 x 1000BASE-T copper RJ-45 ports with POE
 SBx81GS24a - 24 x Gigabit SFP ports
 SBx81XS6 - 6 x 10Gigabit SFP+ ports

SwitchBlade x908

The SwitchBlade x908 was launched in 2008 and has been superseded by the SwitchBlade x908 Generation 2 model. 
The original x908 was a stackable advanced layer 3 3RU chassis switch with 640Gbit/s of switching capacity. It featured eight switch module bays allowing the user to install a large variety of port types to suit their needs. It supported Allied Telesis' Virtual Chassis Stacking technology, allowing two SwitchBlade x908 chassis' to be connected via a high-bandwidth link to support unified management as if they were a single switch. Each chassis included redundant system power supply bays.

 Modules
 XEM-12T - 12x 1000BASE-T copper RJ-45 ports
 XEM-12S - 12x gigabit SFP ports
 XEM-24T - 24 x 1000BASE-T copper RJ point five ports
 XEM-2XT - 2x 10GBASE-T copper RJ-45 ports
 XEM-2XS - 2x 10G SFP+ ports
 XEM-2XP - 2x 10G XFP ports
 XEM-1XP - 1x 10G XFP ports

See also 
 Allied Telesis
 AlliedWare Plus

References

External links

 Allied Telesis homepage
 Allied Telesis SwitchBlade x8112
 Allied Telesis SwitchBlade x908 GEN2

Computer networking